The Subcommittee on Tax is a subcommittee of the Committee on Ways and Means in the United States House of Representatives. Between 2019 and 2023 known as the Subcommittee on Select Revenue Measures, before receiving its current name after a return to Republican control.

Jurisdiction
From the House rules:
The jurisdiction of the Subcommittee on Tax Policy shall consist of those revenue measures that, from time to time, shall be referred to it specifically by the Chairman of the full Committee.

Members, 117th Congress

Historical membership rosters

115th Congress

116th Congress

References

External links
 Ways and Means Committee Website: Subcommittee Page

Ways and Means Select